The Tulane DoubleTree Classic was an annual basketball tournament hosted by Tulane University at Fogelman Arena in New Orleans, Louisiana in December. The tournament started in 1996, the final edition was played in 2009.

History

1996

1997

1998

1999

2000

2001

2002

2003

2004

2005

2006

2007

2008
On December 21, Tulane defeated Providence 68-46 win over Providence to take the championship of the Tulane DoubleTree Classic for the 10th time in 13 seasons. Brett Benzio recorded her second double-double, with 13 points and 11 rebounds to be named tournament MVP.

2009
The 2009 edition will be held from December 28–29.

Most Valuable Players

All Tournament Team
1996
 Barbara Farris, Mary Ann Marino, Grace Daley (Tulane), Becky Hammon, Katie Cronin (Colorado State University), Melinda Goodson (UNC Greensboro).
1997
Grace Daley, Barbara Farris, Kristen Koch (Tulane), Amy O'Brien (Holy Cross), Natasha Lettsome (Appalachian State), Jennifer Meade (Richmond)
1998
 Grace Daley, Janell Burse (Tulane), Jamie Cassidy, Kristen McCormick (Maine), Jackie Smith (Furman), Cortney Neeley (Middle Tennessee State)
1999
 Janell Burse, Fabrecia Roberson, Grace Daley (Tulane), Christin Annie (West Virginia) Monika Roberts (Providence) Anne Tierney (Lehigh)
2000
 Janell Burse, Britt Themann and Teana McKiver (Tulane), Jackie Moore (Long Beach State), Jen Sobota (William & Mary), Janeka Lopp (Hartford)
2001
 Teane McKiver, Gwen Slaughter, Delacey Joseph (Tulane), Telisha Quarles, Brandi Teamer (Virginia), Jessica Kochendorfer (Buffalo)
2002
 Gwen Slaughter, Delacey Joseph, (Tulane), Brianne Stepherson, Jessalyn Deveney (Boston College), Andrea Cossey (Southern Methodist), Nicole Murray (UNC Greensboro)
2003
 Cricket Williams, Tatiana Taylor (San Jose State), Steph Del Preore, Maureen Magarity (Marist) Kelly Nadeau (Tulane), Christina Phillips (Yale)
2004
 D'Aundra Henry, Lakethia Hampton (Tulane), Jennifer Lacy, Daphanie Kennedy (Pepperdine), April Clyburn (Georgia State), Jennifer Simpson (Stephen F. Austin)
2005
 Cara Wright, Terri Ramsey (Dayton), Jennifer Sands (Tulane), Danielle Bishop (Toledo), Cora Beth Smith, Alex Munday (Samford)
2006
 Ashley Langford, Jami Montagnino (Tulane), Terra Wallace, Maryann Abanobi (Texas-Arlington), Beth Troutt (Fordham) Arminite Price (Ole Miss)
2007
 Andrea Barbour, Brittany Cook (Virginia Tech), Chinata Nesbit, Sade Logan (Robert Morris), Ashley Langford (Tulane), Whitney York (Texas-San Antonio)
2008
 Sonya Daugherty (Southeast Missouri State), Erica Lumpkin (Alabama State), Shantee Darrian (Providence), Ashley Langford, Megan Valicevic), Brett Benzio (Tulane) 
2009

Championships by School

References

 

Tulane Green Wave women's basketball
College women's basketball competitions in the United States
College basketball competitions
Basketball in New Orleans
Basketball
1996 establishments in Louisiana
2009 disestablishments in Louisiana
Basketball in Alaska
Recurring sporting events established in 1996
Recurring sporting events disestablished in 2009